Abdulfattah Owainat (born in Kuwait City, Kuwait as Abdul Fattah Abdullah Mohammad Owainat in March 1972) is a Palestinian singer and songwriter best known for his songs on Palestinian Human Rights and their Right of Return as well as various recent uprisings in the Arab World.

Career
Abdulfattah Owainat, sometimes Abed el Fattah studied Islamic Law and Principles in Zarqa Private University, Jordan. He debuted on the professional music scene at an early age, as one of the founders and original members of "Al-Rawabi" band (in Arabic فرقة الروابي meaning the Hills), and began a solo career in 1987 while still an active member of the band as a vocalist, lyricist, musical composer and (formerly) artistic director.

He worked in several media productions companies including Al-Amal for Media Services (in Arabic الأمل meaning Hope), Taif for Media Productions, and currently working as part of New Sound for Media Productions team as a production manager and supervisor.

He has participated in many concerts around the world including the Arab World (Kuwait, KSA, Bahrain, UAE, Qatar, Lebanon, Egypt, Sudan, Yemen, Algeria) as well as Turkey, Sweden, Italy, United Kingdom, Russia, Ukraine, France, Switzerland, Germany, and Canada and is considered one of the well-known artists especially in the Arab World. He also took part in the collaborative song "Hayat lil Alam"(Life for the World) alongside a number of well-known Singers from the Middle East & Gulf Area.

He was also a presenter on a program dedicated to other Muslim Artists and the Muslim Media on Al-Resalah Satellite TV.

Awards
In 2003, won golden award for "Best song" for writing the music for "Amshi w droubi nar" sung by Meys Shalash at the 9th Cairo Festival for Radio and Television
In 2008, won the youth prize for service of Islamic work for his performances in an event organized by Islamic Art Association in Bahrain.

Private life
Kuwait-born Abdul Fattah Owainat is originally from Qalqilya in the city of Tulkarm, Palestine. He is married and has 4 children and currently resides in Amman, Jordan

Discography
with Al-Rawabi
He made many recording with "Al-Rawabi" band including:
 "سلسلة الروابي الجهادي"
 "سلسلة الروابي الأفراح"
 "لحن الغربة"
"رغم الحصار"
"فرحة عُمُر"
"سلام عليك"
مسرحية "لوحات مقدسية"
"زيتونة الأنبياء"
"تحية وطن"
"صقر الكتائب"
"عياش والوطن"
"أطيار السنونو"
"نشيد الغضب"
"صوت الحرية"
"أسطورة جنين"
"خنساء فلسطين"
"عهد ووفاء"
"غربة وطن"
"لا تدمعي غزة"
"أفراح يا ليلة"
"أفراح يوم نجاحو"
ألبوم "طالت ليالينا"

Solo albums
Ya Msafer Oud (يا مسافر عود)
Han el Watan (حن الوطن)
Ahibboul Kheir (أحب الخير)

See also
Music of Palestine

References

External links
Official Website

Living people
1972 births
Kuwaiti emigrants to Jordan
People from Kuwait City
Zarqa University alumni
Kuwaiti artists
Kuwaiti people of Palestinian descent
Palestinian contemporary artists